Jason Alan Brown (born May 22, 1974) is an American professional baseball coach. He was the former catching coach for the New York Yankees of Major League Baseball (MLB). He is currently the catching coach for the Los Angeles Angels of Major League Baseball (MLB).

Career
Brown attended the University of Southern California (USC), where he played college baseball for the USC Trojans. From 2009 to 2014, Brown served as assistant coach of the Orleans Firebirds of the Cape Cod Baseball League. He served as an assistant coach at USC in 2012. In 2015, he was the hitting coach for the Gulf Coast Yankees. He served as the bullpen coach for the Scranton/Wilkes-Barre RailRiders, and as a coaching assistant for the New York Yankees. He was named the Yankees' catching coach before the 2018 season.

References

External links

1974 births
Living people
Altoona Curve players
American expatriate baseball players in Canada
Baseball catchers
Baseball coaches from California
Baseball players from Long Beach, California
Brevard County Manatees players
Calgary Cannons players
Cape Cod Baseball League coaches
Columbus Clippers players
Edmonton Trappers players
Gulf Coast Marlins players
Harrisburg Senators players
Lynchburg Hillcats players
Minor league baseball coaches
New York Yankees coaches
Orlando Rays players
Portland Sea Dogs players
San Bernardino Stampede players
Scranton/Wilkes-Barre Yankees players
Sportspeople from Long Beach, California
Trenton Thunder players
Tampa Yankees players
USC Trojans baseball players
Vero Beach Dodgers players
Yakima Bears players